Denbury and Torbryan is a civil parish in Teignbridge, Devon, England. It includes the villages of Denbury and Torbryan. As of 2019, it has a population of 961.

History 
The parish was renamed from "Denbury" on 1 April 1998.

References

External links

Civil parishes in Devon
Teignbridge